The Swan 100 was designed by German Frers and built by Nautor's Swan and first launched in 2002. Originally launched as th 100RS the S and FD version were later developed to use the hull moulding.

References

External links
 Nautor Swan
 German Frers Official Website

Sailing yachts
Keelboats
2000s sailboat type designs
Sailboat types built by Nautor Swan
Sailboat type designs by Germán Frers